Philippe Bouyer (born 7 March 1969) is a French physicist, researcher and director at the Laboratory for Photonics, Numerics and Nano-sciences in Talence, France. He is also co-founder of Muquans, a company specialized in quantum technology-based gravity meters. He is deputy director of the Institut d'Optique Graduate School and Editor in Chief  of the new AVS Quantum Science journal from AIP Publishing and the American Vacuum Society.

Bouyer graduated from Institut d'Optique Graduate School and obtained his PhD in Laboratoire Kastler Brossel at Ecole Normale Supérieure in 1994. After joining the French National Center for Scientific Research, he focused his research on ultracold atoms, atom lasers and Anderson localization. His current research interest concern matter-wave interferometry for tests of general relativity in microgravity and detection of gravitational waves.

He was awarded the Louis D. award from the Institut de France in 2012. He is an APS Fellow and senior member of the Optical Society of America.

References 

1969 births
Living people
French physicists
Fellows of the American Physical Society